The Estadio Ciudad de Tudela, formerly Estadio José Antonio Elola is a multi-use stadium located in Tudela, Navarre, Spain.

It is currently used for football matches and is the home stadium of CD Tudelano with a 11,000 capacity. The stadium was inaugurated on August 17, 1969.

References

External links
CD Tudelano Official website 
Estadios de España 

CD Tudelano
Football venues in Navarre
Sports venues completed in 1969